"You're My Number One" is a song by British pop group S Club 7, released as the fourth and final single from the band's debut album, S Club (1999), on 13 December 1999. The single was released only in UK as a double A-side with "Two in a Million" and peaked at number two on the UK Singles Chart; in other countries, only "Two in a Million" was released. It was the first S Club 7 single to be released as a double A-side, later followed by "Say Goodbye" and "Love Ain't Gonna Wait for You" in 2003. "You're My Number One" is described as a fun up-tempo retro number.

Single information
"You're My Number One" is an upbeat, retro-styled song about a person questioning what love is to them. They feel that if love is what they are feeling, then they have to tell the person they like that they're their "number one", in that nobody else is right for them. The Miami 7 version of the song is different from the album version, as it contains a heavier drum track, features multilayered vocals from Jo in the chorus and takes on a more modern style. The Miami 7 version of the song was not actually the version heard on Miami 7, as it and the album version contain a different intro and take on different approaches than the version heard on Miami 7.

The single contains an exclusive B-side, "Down at Club S", which was performed during episode three of Miami 7, "The Blue Chevy". It is very much in a similar style to "You're My Number One", and was co-written by Simon Franglen and Angela Lupino, who also wrote "Gonna Change the World" for the group. The single also includes an alternate version of "Two in a Million" known as the 2000 version.

Music video
The music video for the song was shot in New York City. Throughout, S Club 7 are performing a dance routine in front of a white background. Halfway through the video, the group partake in a foam fight. Towards the end, the band are joined by many more dancers who perform the same hand jive-esque routine until the end of the music video. In an interview, Bradley McIntosh recalls that each member was brought a selection of outfits to choose from to wear in the video, but he was only brought one outfit to wear, which he hated.

Track listings
 UK CD1
 "Two in a Million" (Boyfriends & Birthdays version)
 "You're My Number One" (Miami 7 version)
 "We Can Work It Out"
 "Two in a Million" (CD-ROM video)

 UK CD2
 "You're My Number One" (Miami 7 version)
 "Two in a Million" (2000 version)
 "Down at Club S"
 "You're My Number One" (CD-ROM video)

 UK cassette single
A. "Two in a Million" (Boyfriends & Birthdays version)
B. "You're My Number One" (Miami 7 version)

Credits and personnel
Credits are lifted from the S Club album booklet.

Studio
 Mastered at Transfermation (London, England)

Personnel

 Dufflebag Boys – writing
 Anna Ross – backing vocals
 Absolute – all instruments, production
 Milton McDonald – guitars
 The Kick Horns – brass, brass arrangement
 Paul P-Dub Walton – engineering
 Steve Fitzmaurice – engineering, mixing
 Keith Uddin – mixing assistant
 Noel Summerville – mastering
 Richard Dowling – mastering

Charts
All entries charted with "Two in a Million".

Weekly charts

Year-end charts

References

S Club 7 songs
1999 singles
1999 songs
Polydor Records singles
Song recordings produced by Absolute (production team)